Alisa Mikonsaari (born 19 June 1993) is a Finnish figure skater. She is the  2013 Finnish national bronze medalist and 2011 Finlandia Trophy bronze medalist.

Competitive Career 
Mikonsaari replaced the injured Kiira Korpi in the Finnish team to the 2012 World Championships two weeks prior to the event, where she. 

She was also named as Korpi's replacement at the 2013 European Championships, where she finished in twenty-ninth place. Following that season, she retired from competitive figure skating due to a nagging hip injury.

Coaching Career 
Following her figure skating career, Minkonsaari began working as a coach after being invited by former coach, Angelina Turenko, to coach in Saint Petersburg, Russia. She briefly moved back to Finland following the outbreak of the COVID-19 pandemic before moving to Egna, Italy to coach at the Young Goose Academy in 2021.

Her current and former students include:
  Daniel Grassl
  Gabriele Frangipani
  Anna Pezzetta
  Jari Kessler
  Tomàs-Llorenç Guarino Sabaté
  Barbora Vrankova
  Naoki Rossi
  Vladimir Samoilov
  Júlia Láng
  Tobia Oellerer

Personal life 
Mikonsaari's mother is Russian and her father Finnish.

Programs

Competitive highlights

References

External links 

 
 Alisa Mikonsaari at Sport-folio.net
 Alisa Mikonsaari at Tracings

1993 births
Finnish female single skaters
Living people
People from Lappeenranta
Finnish people of Russian descent
Sportspeople from South Karelia